Tamsin may refer to:

 Tamsin, short form of Thomasina

Persons
 Tamsin (given name)
 Tamsin Agnes Margaret Olivier, English actress; daughter of actors Laurence Olivier and Joan Plowright
 Tamsin Blanchard, British fashion journalist
 Tamsin Carroll (born 1979), Australian actress
 Tamsin Cook (born 1998), Australian swimmer
 Tamsin Dunwoody (born 1958), sometimes known as Tamsin Dunwoody-Kneafsey, British politician
 Tamsin Egerton (born 1988), British actress
 Tamsin Ford (born 1966), British psychiatrist specialising in children's mental health
 Tamsin Greenway (born 1982), English netball player
 Tamsin Greig (born 1966), British actress
 Tamsin Heatley, British actress and voice artist
 Tamsin Hinchley (born 1980), Australian volleyball player
 Tamsin Mather (born 1976), British Professor of Earth Sciences
 Tamsin Pickeral (born 1971), British author and art historian
 Tamsin West (born 1974), Australian actress and singer

Characters
 Tamsin, a character in the Canadian television series Lost Girl
 Tamsin Yeobright from The Return of the Native by Thomas Hardy. Her name is given alternately as Tamsin or Thomasin throughout the book.
 Tamsin Drew, companion in the Doctor Who audio dramas.
 Tamsin Greene, character in the Once a Witch series.
 Tamsin, character in Return of the Indian In The Cupboard

Others
 Tamsin (novel), a 1999 fantasy novel by Peter S. Beagle

See also
Tamzin
Tasmin
Tazmin